The Israelite Rabbinical Academy is a Black Hebrew Israelite academy in the United States that is affiliated with the International Israelite Board of Rabbis.

History
The academy originated as an offshoot of Wentworth Arthur Matthew's Royal Order of Ethiopian Hebrews, founded in 1925. In 1970, under the leadership of Chief Rabbi Levi Ben Levy, the Ethiopian Hebrew Rabbinical College was renamed the Israelite Rabbinical Academy. The academy was established under the charter of the International Israelite Board of Rabbis in the New York City.

Relationship with Rabbinic Judaism
The Black Orthodox Jewish writer and activist Shais Rishon has written that the Israelite Rabbinical Academy is not a Jewish institution, rejecting their use of the word rabbi. According to Rishon, Wentworth A. Matthew, Levi Ben Levy and others associated with the board never "belonged nor converted to any branch of Judaism", nor have any graduates of the academy with the exceptions of Capers Funnye and Eli Aronoff.

Graduates
Capers Funnye

See also
Black Hebrew Israelites
International Israelite Board of Rabbis

References

External links
Israelite Academy, BlackJews.org

1925 establishments in the United States
International Israelite Board of Rabbis